Nas Portas do Cu (Portuguese for "At the Doors of the Ass") is the fourteenth studio album by the Brazilian musician Rogério Skylab, and the second installment of a trilogy, the "Trilogia do Cu" ("Trilogy of the Ass"). It was released on January 1, 2019, and is available for free download on the musician's official website and for streaming.

The album and the trilogy it is part of as a whole were originally announced by Skylab on his official Facebook page on March 7, 2018. On a later post, from December 3, he stated that production of Nas Portas do Cu was "nearing completion" and that it would be released on January 1 of the following year. Lívio Tragtenberg, who collaborated with Skylab on the Skylab & Tragtenberg trilogy of albums, contributed with Nas Portas do Cu by pre-mixing the album and providing the samples.

The track "Catatau" is a reference to the eponymous experimental novel by Paulo Leminski, originally published in 1975.

Critical reception
Writing for webzine Esquinas, owned by the Cásper Líbero Foundation, Henrique Artuni spoke very favorably of Nas Portas do Cu, calling it an album "whose greatness can be compared to Skylab VII, Skylab X and Skygirls". He also praised Skylab as a "chameleonic artist", and noted how he and his music visibly "matured" over time.

Track listing

Personnel
 Rogério Skylab – vocals, production
 Thiago Martins – electric guitar, classical guitar
 Yves Aworet – bass guitar
 Alex Curi – drums
 Lívio Tragtenberg – pre-mixing, sampling
 Vânius Marques – mixing, mastering
 Solange Venturi – cover art

References

2019 albums
Rogério Skylab albums
Self-released albums
Sequel albums
Obscenity controversies in music
Albums free for download by copyright owner